Sikandar Kharbanda (born Sahil Kharbanda; 30 January 1979) is an Indian actor. He works mainly in Hindi television and Bhojpuri films.

Career
Sikandar made his debut on TV with Kahani Ghar Ghar Ki playing the role of Yash Garg,

He made a guest appearance in Kahani Teri Meri, Karam Apna Apna and Aa Gale Lag Jaa. Later he appeared in Tumhari Disha as Taj. His next role was as Vikram in Kahin Kissi Roz.

Personal life
Born as Sahil, he completed his schooling from Mount Saint Mary's School in 1994. He did his Bachelor of Arts from Venkateshwara College, University of Delhi. He took his maternal grandfather, Sikander Lal Kapoor's first name as his screen name. His maternal grandfather was a tailor while his maternal grandmother, Susheela Kapoor, was a housewife. He has three maternal uncles, Shakti, Parvin and Rummy Kapoor. His mother Renu Kapoor Kharbanda is a housewife. His uncle is actor Shakti Kapoor.

Kharbanda married his Kasauti Zindagi Kay co-star Geetanjali Tikekar. The two have a son named Shaurya.

Filmography

Television

Films

Bhojpuri TV series 
Badka Sahab

References

External links
 
 Sikandar Kharbanda at Bollywood Hungama

21st-century Indian male actors
Indian male television actors
1979 births
Living people
Punjabi people
Delhi University alumni
Male actors in Bhojpuri cinema
Male actors in Hindi cinema
People from Delhi